Danz Showdown is a 2010 Philippine television talent show broadcast by GMA Network. Hosted by Mark Herras and Izzy Trazona, it premiered on July 5, 2010 replacing Daisy Siete. The show concluded on October 1, 2010 with a total of 55 episodes.

The winner received .

Plot
Known for their platinum hits such as Spaghetti, Bakit Papa up to Bilog na Hugis Itlog, their latest single which was lauded for being instrumental in GMA-7's Voter Education Campaign, the Sexbomb Dancers are raring more than ever to reach new heights and share the glory with a new member. Coming from humble beginnings themselves, they believe that there are many undiscovered dancers whose talents are worth seeing on television and whose dreams are worth fulfilling. Focus E, Incorporated and GMA Network, in harmony with the group's belief, put together a dance reality show that will not only entertain but more importantly, capture a global quality of dancing. There will be rigorous training, unexpected challenges, various dance themes, wild transformations and a grand prize worth half a million pesos (250, 000 cash and 250,000 worth of contract) –all in the name of selecting and honing the one best dancer. To host the show are no less than the Badboy of the Dance Floor Mark Herras and Sexbomb Diva Izzy Trazona. Since the hopefuls are unavoidably budding showbiz personalities, they will be tested on and off the stage. From Monday to Friday, the sizzling duo of Mark and Izzy will update audiences about their progress, setbacks, personal issues and whatnots. As the hopefuls bust their moves, they will be under the meticulous eye of judges composed of choreographer extraordinaire Maribeth Bechara, Sexbomb leader Rochelle Pangilinan and a surprise guest of the week. The audiences too will determine who deserves to stay via their text votes. Sexbomb guru Joy Cancio and Sexbomb adviser Presley Balili, aside from giving constant moral support, will also help in the first wave of the elimination process. Of course, the show would not be complete without the Sexbomb Girls themselves. Together, they will test the hopefuls’ skills and determination by becoming showdown masters who will either teach or compete with the contestants. All these plus loads of bombastic twists and turns, literally and figuratively, await the hopefuls.

Ratings
According to AGB Nielsen Philippines' Mega Manila People/Individual television ratings, the pilot episode of Danz Showdown earned a 3.9% rating. While the final episode scored a 3.2% rating.

Accolades

References

External links
 

2010 Philippine television series debuts
2010 Philippine television series endings
Filipino-language television shows
GMA Network original programming
Philippine reality television series